John J. Kimmel (13 December 1866 – 18 September 1942) was a German-American musician known for playing Irish, Scottish, and American music on the 1-row diatonic accordion (or melodeon). Though not Irish-American, but rather German-American (born in Brooklyn to German immigrants Margaretha Schmidt and John Kimmel), Kimmel's playing had an enduring effect on the playing of the Irish accordion.

Kimmel's career stretched roughly from 1904–1920, largely in New York City. His earliest recordings, done on Edison Wax Cylinder, were around 1906. Kimmel's works often appeared under the name Kimmble, and he was known to bill himself as the Irish Dutchman (cf. Deutsch).

Discography

Irish Boy March (Victor Records 1907)
Medley of Irish Jigs (Emerson Records 1919)
Medley of Irish Reels (Emerson Records 1919)
John Kimmel - Virtuoso of the Irish Accordion (Smithsonian Institution Folkways Records, 1980)
Accordion Solo - Medley of Reels No2 (Indestructible phonograph Cylinder record 1908)

Tributes
John J. Kimmel, un héritage fabuleux (2010)

See also
Irish accordion in the United States

References

External links
 John J. Kimmel recordings at the Discography of American Historical Recordings.
Discography at HonkingDuck.com

American accordionists
Celtic folk musicians
American people of German descent
1866 births
1942 deaths
Musicians from Brooklyn